Freedom is understood as either having the ability to act or change without constraint or to possess the power and resources to fulfill one's purposes unhindered. Freedom is often associated with liberty and autonomy in the sense of "giving oneself one's own laws", and with having rights and the civil liberties with which to exercise them without undue interference by the state. Frequently discussed kinds of political freedom include freedom of assembly, freedom of association, freedom of choice, and freedom of speech.

In one definition, something is "free" if it can change easily and is not constrained in its present state. (Physicists and chemists may use the word in this sense.) Philosophy and religion sometimes associate freedom with free will, without undue or unjust constraints on that will, such as enslavement. It is an idea closely tied with the concept of negative liberty.

 Charles Taylor resolves one of the issues that separate "positive" and "negative" theories of freedom, as these were initially distinguished in Isaiah Berlin's seminal 1958 lecture,  "Two concepts of liberty". Taylor sees it as undeniable that there are two such families of conceptions of political freedom. Negative liberty is a concept that is often used in political philosophy. It is the idea that freedom means an ability to do what one wants, without external obstacles. This concept has been called too simplistic for discounting the importance of individual self-realization. Positive liberty is the ability to fulfill one's purposes.

In its origin, the  English word "freedom" relates etymologically to the word "friend".

Types

In political discourse, political freedom is often associated with liberty and autonomy in the sense of "giving oneself their own laws", and with having rights and the civil liberties with which to exercise them without undue interference by the state. Frequently discussed kinds of political freedom include freedom of assembly, freedom of association, freedom of choice, and freedom of speech.

In some occasions, particularly when discussion is limited to political freedoms, the terms "freedom" and "liberty" tend to be used interchangeably. Elsewhere, subtle distinctions between freedom and liberty are noted. John Stuart Mill differentiated liberty from freedom in that freedom is primarily, if not exclusively, the ability to do as one wills and what one has the power to do, whereas liberty concerns the absence of arbitrary restraints and takes into account the rights of all involved. As such, the exercise of liberty is subject to capability and limited by the rights of others.

Wendy Hui Kyong Chun explains the differences in terms of their relation to institutions:

Another distinction that some political theorists have deemed important is that people may aspire to have freedom from limiting forces (such as freedom from fear, freedom from want, and freedom from discrimination), but descriptions of freedom and liberty generally do not invoke having liberty from anything. To the contrary, the concept of negative liberty refers to the liberty one person may have to restrict the rights of others.

Other important fields in which freedom is an issue include economic freedom, academic freedom, intellectual freedom, scientific freedom and political freedom.

See also
 Internet freedom
 Freedom Riders
 Freethought
 Statue of Freedom, an 1863 sculpture by Thomas Crawford atop the dome of the US Capitol
 Statue of Liberty (Liberty Enlightening the World), 1886 statue by Frédéric Auguste Bartholdi in New York City]]
 Goddess of Liberty, an 1888 statue by Elijah E. Myers atop the Texas State Capitol dome, in Austin, Texas 
Miss Freedom, 1889 statue on the dome of the Georgia State Capitol (US)
Freedom, 1985 statue by Alfred Tibor in Columbus, Ohio
Freedom songs
Freedom & Civilization, 1944 book about freedom from anthropological perspective

References

External links
 "Freedom", BBC Radio 4 discussion with John Keane, Bernard Williams & Annabel Brett (In Our Time, 4 July 2002)

Social concepts
Rights